The David A. Stein Riverdale/Kingsbridge Academy is a public middle school and high school in the Riverdale section of the Bronx. It serves roughly 1,500 students. The school opened as Junior High School 141 in 1957 after a years-long crusade by local parents and The Riverdale Press to bring new schools to a neighborhood that was experiencing explosive growth. A similar effort added the high school in 1999.

In 1983, in recognition of the role he and his newspaper had played in advocating for construction of the school, the city named it in honor of David A. Stein, the founder and publisher of The Riverdale Press, who had died a year earlier.

Curriculum 

In addition to a diverse college preparatory curriculum, Riverdale Kingsbridge Academy offers a middle school Honors Program, Advanced Placement courses, and enrollment courses through Hunter College. Advanced Placement courses include Spanish, U.S. history, art, biology, calculus, and literature.

Extracurricular activities 

Student groups and activities at Riverdale Kingsbridge Academy include band, book clubs, after school clubs environmental club, Model United Nations, MOUSE Squad, National Honor Society and National Junior Honor Society, Literary Magazine (Paw Print), Nutrition Club, Science Olympiad, and Yearbook.

Riverdale Kingsbridge Academy athletic teams compete in the PSAL (high school) and CHAMPS (middle school). The high school teams include baseball, basketball, golf, lacrosse, soccer, softball, volleyball, and wrestling. The middle school teams include dance, tennis, and wrestling.

The baseball team won the 2010 Division B Championship, finishing with a perfect 21–0 record. In the 2016–2017 season, the boys cross country team won fourth place as a team at the PSAL Varsity City Championship achieving the State Qualifying standard, the first-ever RKA team in history to compete at the New York State Championship.

Demographics 
In the 2017–2018 school year, 1% of students were American Indian/Native American, 8% were Asian American, 9% were Black, 56% were Hispanic/Latino, 25% were white, and 1% were multiracial.

References

External links 

 

Public high schools in the Bronx
Public middle schools in the Bronx
Riverdale, Bronx